Boambolo is a locality in the Yass Valley Council, New South Wales, Australia. It is on the Yass–Wee Jasper road about 15 km south of Yass.

References

Yass Valley Council
Localities in New South Wales
Southern Tablelands